Jaunbērze Parish is an administrative unit of Dobele Municipality, Latvia.

Towns, villages and settlements of Jaunbērze Parish 
Jaunbērze
Mežinieki
Apšupe
Sīpele
Kazupe

References 

Dobele Municipality
Parishes of Latvia